Mabana is an unincorporated community in Island County, in the U.S. state of Washington.

History
A post office called Mabana was established in 1912, and remained in operation until 1936. The community's name is an amalgamation of the name of Mabel Anderson, the child of a first settler.

References

Unincorporated communities in Island County, Washington
Unincorporated communities in Washington (state)